EHC Visp is a Swiss professional ice hockey team based in Visp and competing in the Swiss League (SL). The club was founded in 1939 and became Swiss champion in 1962. Visp has also won the league title in NLB three times; 1960, 2011 and 2014.

Their home arena is the 5,150-seat Lonza Arena.

History
EHC Visp was founded in 1939 and rose up the professional ranks to the National League A in the 1959–60 season. Visp would establish itself there for more than 10 years with the highlight capturing the Swiss championship title in the 1961–62 season on 3 February 1962, winning 3–0 against HC Davos. In 1964 EHC Visp won the Swiss Cup. 3-0 - but this championship title was not repeated. In 1964, EHC Visp also won the Swiss Cup. Bibi Torriani was the head coach of EHC Visp from 1960 until 1965.

Honors
Swiss Championships: (1) 1962
National League B Championships: (3) 1960, 2011, 2014
Swiss Cup: (1) 1964

References

External links
 EHC Visp official website

Ice hockey teams in Switzerland
Sport in Valais